Lebioderus is a genus of beetles in the family Carabidae, containing the following species:

 Lebioderus bakeri Heller, 1926 
 Lebioderus brancuccii Nagel, 2009 
 Lebioderus candezei C.A.Dohrn, 1888 
 Lebioderus dissimilis Luna De Carvalho, 1973 
 Lebioderus gorii Westwood, 1838 
 Lebioderus javanus C.A.Dohrn, 1891 
 Lebioderus percheronii Westwood, 1874 
 Lebioderus ritsemae Gestro, 1901 
 Lebioderus thaianus Maruyama, 2008

References

Paussinae